"Steppin' Out" is a hit song for Kool & the Gang.  It reached #89 on the Billboard Hot 100 and #12 on the R&B chart. The song was re-released in 2004, featuring Beverley Knight, for the remix album The Hits: Reloaded.

Record World said it has a "big brisk beat...punchy horns and sleek backing vocals."

Track listing

De-Lite Records – DE-815:

Charts

References

External links

 

1981 songs
1981 singles
Kool & the Gang songs
Songs written by Ronald Bell (musician)
Songs written by James "J.T." Taylor
Songs written by Claydes Charles Smith
Songs written by Robert "Kool" Bell
Songs written by Eumir Deodato
De-Lite Records singles